The New England Annual Conference is an Annual Conference (a regional episcopal area, similar to a diocese) of the United Methodist Church. This conference serves the congregations in Maine, New Hampshire, Massachusetts, Rhode Island, eastern Connecticut, and all of Vermont. The conference's administrative offices and the office of the bishop are located in Lawrence, Massachusetts. It is part of the Northeastern Jurisdictional Conference. The bishop is the Reverend Sudarshana Devadhar (Boston Area).

"HISTORY:"
(SOURCE- The Wesley Center)
Asbury traversed New England each of these years down to the last before that of his death. He always approached it with peculiar feelings; with mingled repugnance and hopefulness. He seemed there as in a foreign land, while all the rest of the nation was his familiar domain. Everywhere else he was welcomed by enthusiastic throngs; there he was repelled, and pursued his solitary journeys comparatively a stranger, finding refuge in families which were proscribed as heretical by public opinion, and in "meetings" which were impeached as fanatical "conventicles." Yet he believed that Methodism would "radiate" over these elder communities. "I feel," he writes, "as if God will work in these states and give us a great harvest; a glorious work of God will be wrought here. Surely we shall rise in New England in the next generation." He lived to see the verification of his prediction. To him the religious life of New England presented an example of the rigid Hebrew legalism, strangely combined with the speculative dogmatism of the early Greek Church but unrelieved by the spiritual mysticism of the latter, and nearly destitute of the vital charity and joyousness primitive faith.

Its distinctive theology he detested; it seemed to him to bind, as in iron bands, the souls of the people; depressing, by its tenets of election and reprobation with uncomplaining but profound distress, scrupulous, timid, and therefore often the best consciences; inflating the confidence and Pharisaism of the self-reliant or self-conceited, who assumed their predestination to heaven; enforcing the morality without the gracious consolation of religion; and giving to the recklessly immoral an apology for their lives in their very demoralization, their lack of "effectual grace," of "an effectual call." Devout Augustinian theologians would not indeed admit his logic; such was nevertheless his honest estimate of the New England Church, and he continually returned to the East, directing the best energies of Methodism against its traditional beliefs and ecclesiastical stagnancy.

There, more than anywhere else, we have to regret the scantiness of his journals, for there, in his hardest field, his reflections as well as his facts would be most interesting to us. He re-entered it in the spring of 1804, and on the fourteenth of July opened the New England Conference at Buxton, Me. The ordination was held in a wood, where the bishop preached from a heavy heart. He describes the occasion as "an open time." "The work of God broke forth," he says, "on the right and on the left." A great sensation spread among the multitude, and before the session closed it was estimated that fifty persons were converted. Snelling says, "There was a greater display of divine power at this Conference than any I ever attended. Many of the people were wrought upon in a very powerful manner; but, as is generally the case, there was some opposition. At one meeting a man, appearing to be in a violent passion, came in, and called for his wife, bidding her leave immediately. She urged him to stay a little longer. 'No,' said he; 'let us go.' He then started to go, but paused a few moments, then turned back, fell upon his knees, and prayed for mercy as earnestly as any. The preachers were placed in different directions in the grove, praying and exhorting. The people would gather around them in companies, similar to what are called praying circles at camp-meetings. In the circle which I was in there were eleven persons who professed to be brought from darkness to light, besides many
others who were inquiring what they must do to be saved." [1] "It was," wrote Joshua Taylor, "the greatest time that we have seem in New England."

The New England Annual Conference maintains four campground/retreat centers:
Camp Aldersgate, North Scituate, Rhode Island
Camp Mechuwana, Winthrop, Maine
Rolling Ridge Conference and Retreat Center, North Andover, Massachusetts
Wanakee United Methodist Center, Meredith, New Hampshire

Districts
The New England Annual Conference is further subdivided into 8 smaller regions, called "districts," which provide further administrative functions for the operation of local churches in cooperation with each other. This structure is vital to Methodism, and is referred to as connectionalism. The districts that comprise the New England Annual Conference are:

District 1 - Northern Maine

District Superintendent the Rev. Jackie Brannen

District 2 - Mid-Maine

District Superintendent the Rev. Karen Munson

District 3 - New Hampshire

District Superintendent the Rev. Gwen Puroshotham, interim

District 4 - Tri-State

District 5 - Connecticut/Western Mass

District 6 - Central Massachusetts

District Superintendent the Rev. Rene A. Perez

District 7 - Metro Boston Hope

District 8 - Rhode Island/Southeastern Mass
District Superintendent - Rev. Dr. Andrew Foster III
Southeastern Massachusetts
Acushnet Wesley United Methodist Church, Acushnet
Long Plain United Methodist Church, Acushnet, MA
Myricks United Methodist Church, Berkley
Bourne United Methodist Church, Bourne
Northside United Methodist Church, Brewster
Bridgewater United Methodist Church, Bridgewater
Bryantville United Methodist Church, Bryantville
Carver United Parish, Carver
Cataumet United Methodist Church, Cataumet
First United Methodist Church, Chatham
Chilmark Community Church, Chilmark
Cotuit Federated Church, Cotuit
Cuttyhunk Union Methodist Church, Cuttyhunk Island
High Street United Methodist Church, Duxbury
East Bridgewater United Methodist Church, East Bridgewater
Eastham United Methodist Church, Eastham
Harwich United Methodist Church, East Harwich
Haven United Methodist Church, East Providence, RI
Edgartown United Methodist Church, Edgartown
Union United Methodist Church, Fall River
John Wesley United Methodist Church, Falmouth
Faith Fellowship United Methodist Church, Mansfield
 Central United Methodist Church, Middleborough
South Middleborough United Methodist Church, Middleborough
Nantucket United Methodist Church, Nantucket
Centre Trinity UMC, New Bedford
Saint Paul's United Methodist Church, New Bedford
Chartley Norton United Methodist Church, Norton
Trinity United Methodist Church, Oak Bluffs
Saint Mark's United Methodist Church, Onset
Orleans United Methodist Church, Orleans
Osterville United Methodist Church, Osterville
Plymouth United Methodist Church, Plymouth
Provincetown United Methodist Church, Provincetown
Swift Memorial United Methodist Church, Sagamore Beach
Somerset United Methodist Church, Somerset
South Yarmouth United Methodist Church, South Yarmouth
Memorial United Methodist Church, Taunton
Trinity United Methodist Church, Taunton
Christ United Methodist Church, Vineyard Haven
Wesley United Methodist Church, Wareham
Wellfleet United Methodist Church, Wellfleet
Cochesett United Methodist Church, West Bridgewater
West Falmouth United Methodist Church, West Falmouth
Westport Point United Methodist Church, Westport Point
Rhode Island
Barrington United Methodist Church, Barrington
Arnold Mills United Methodist Church, Cumberland
Cornerstone of Faith United Methodist Church, Coventry
Greene United Methodist Church, Coventry
East Greenwich United Methodist Church, East Greenwich
Shepherd of the Valley United Methodist Church, Hope
Christ United Methodist Church, Kingston
Wesley United Methodist Church, Lincoln
Calvary United Methodist Church, Middletown
Saint Paul's United Methodist Church, Newport
North Kingstown United Methodist Church, North Kingstown
Epworth United Methodist Church, Pawtucket
Portsmouth United Methodist Church, Portsmouth
Mathewson Street United Methodist Church, Providence
Trinity United Methodist Church, Providence
Vida Abundante United Methodist Church, Providence
First United Methodist Church of Warren/Bristol, Warren
Asbury United Methodist Church, Warwick
Open Table of Christ United Methodist Church, Warwick and Providence
Zion Korean United Methodist Church, Warwick
Grace United Methodist Church, Westerly
The River United Methodist Communities of Faith, Woonsocket

See also
Annual Conferences of the United Methodist Church

External links
New England Annual Conference of The United Methodist Church

Methodism in Connecticut
Methodism in Massachusetts
Methodism in Maine
Methodism in New Hampshire
Methodism in Rhode Island
Methodism in Vermont
United Methodism by region
United Methodist Annual Conferences
Religion in New England